The Islamic College of South Australia is in West Croydon, a suburb of Adelaide, South Australia. It offers classes from kindergarten to year 12.

It has been a working school since 1997 but opened in 1926, where it first set up next to the Wandana Mosque on Wandana Avenue in Gilles Plains. It moved to 22A Cedar Avenue in West Croydon in 2000.

The Islamic College of South Australia is owned and managed by the Australian Federation of Islamic Councils (AFIC).

In 2012, the school was in dispute with AFIC in regards to financial irregularities, which were uncovered during a federal audit.

In 2013, a female staff member was dismissed for failing to adhere to the school's dress code. The teachers' union took the matter to Fair Work Australia.

In May 2015, parents with-held their children from attending the college and have accused the board of firing principals and teachers.  The Imams Council of South Australia expressed its concern, and the federal education minister said he takes these issues very seriously.
 
In July 2015, a member of the board took a male student to a haircut salon, forcing him to get a haircut without his mother's permission.

In October 2015, the entire school board was sacked. That December, all government funding for the college was frozen.

In February 2017, the federal Minister for Education and Training, Simon Birmingham, said the school had failed to meet obligations relating to governance, to financial management and to regular reporting. He said that federal funding for the school would cease in April 2017.

In March 2017, it was reported that, following a police request, the Australian Securities and Investments Commission had been undertaking financial investigations into the more than $1 million potentially missing and the high rentals paid to AFIC.

See also
 Islam in Australia
 Islamic organisations in Australia
 Islamic schools and branches

References

External links
http://icosa.sa.edu.au/

Private schools in South Australia
Islamic schools in Australia